Kalle Markus Palander (born May 2, 1977 in Tornio) is a Finnish retired alpine skier, the most successful male Finn ever in the sport.

Career
In 1999 Palander won the world championship in slalom. He also won the Alpine skiing World Cup in slalom during the 2002–2003 season, and was fourth in the overall standings. Palander has also been successful in giant slalom. He is known for his relaxed attitude and for wearing a red toque instead of a helmet when participating in slalom competitions.

World Cup victories

Overall victories

World Cup victories

References

External links
 
 
 Kalle Palander at Virtual Finland
 

1977 births
Living people
People from Tornio
Finnish male alpine skiers
Alpine skiers at the 1998 Winter Olympics
Alpine skiers at the 2002 Winter Olympics
Alpine skiers at the 2006 Winter Olympics
Olympic alpine skiers of Finland
FIS Alpine Ski World Cup champions
Sportspeople from Lapland (Finland)